The Liberation Battalion – LB (Arabic: أفواج التحرير transliteration Afwaj al-Tahrir) or Battalion de la Liberation (BL) in French was a small, shadowy terrorist organization dedicated to attacking Syrian Army forces in Lebanon during the mid-late 1980s.

Origins
Apparently a mixed Christian-Muslim group of unknown strength, it is believed that the Liberation Battalion was associated both with the larger Lebanese Islamic Resistance Movement – Hezbollah and the Christian Lebanese Forces militia (LF), but carried out its own actions independently.  The Liberation Battalion released its manifesto soon after being formed in early October 1987, establishing their primary goal as an armed resistance movement to the perceived Syrian occupation of Lebanon.  Other objectives included an end to sectarian violence and a negotiation towards terms of coexistence and mutual respect as well as complete independence from all foreign occupation or interference of any kind.

Activities and decline
Operating mainly on the urban and sub-urban areas of Beirut, they claimed responsibility for at least ten guerrilla attacks targeting Syrian troops in Lebanon from October to December 1987, mostly through public statements made to the LF-controlled station Radio Free Lebanon.  Such actions prompted a direct response by the Syrian military, usually in the form of raids on villages and neighbourhoods suspected of supporting the Liberation Battalion cause, particularly in West Beirut, where they rounded up hundreds of suspects.  These waves of arrests may account for the sudden halt of the group’s activities and their subsequent disappearance by early 1988.  They are now presumed inactive.

See also 
 Guardians of the Cedars
 Hezbollah
 Lebanese Civil War
 Lebanese Forces (Militia)
 Lebanese Liberation Front
 Sons of the South
 Popular Revolutionary Resistance Organization

References

Edgar O'Ballance, Civil War in Lebanon, 1975-92, Palgrave Macmillan, London 1998. 
 Rex Brynen, Sanctuary and Survival: the PLO in Lebanon, Boulder: Westview Press, Oxford 1990.  – 
Robert Fisk, Pity the Nation: Lebanon at War, London: Oxford University Press, (3rd ed. 2001).  –

Further reading

 Jean Sarkis, Histoire de la guerre du Liban, Presses Universitaires de France - PUF, Paris 1993.  (in French)
 Samir Kassir, La Guerre du Liban: De la dissension nationale au conflit régional, Éditions Karthala/CERMOC, Paris 1994.  (in French)

Factions in the Lebanese Civil War